John Cash Neild (4 January 1846 – 8 March 1911) was an Australian politician who served as a Senator from New South Wales from 1901 to 1910.

Neild's family arrived in Australia in 1860, and he worked as an insurance agent and company manager before winning election to the New South Wales Legislative Assembly in 1885. He served intermittently until 1901 and had a tumultuous career as a backbencher, eventually contributing significantly to the fall of the Reid government in 1899. He also established his own volunteer regiment, which had a difficult and sometimes hostile relationship with military command.

Elected in 1901 to the Senate, Neild was a vigorous supporter of old-age pensions, free trade and several other causes, but his ambitions of promotion were never realised. Passionately loyal to the British Empire, he questioned aspects of the White Australia policy and spoke in support of the children of Kanaka labourers facing deportation. His continued disputes with the military, including an attempt to have the commander of the Australian military forces found in contempt of Parliament, saw him lose respect among his colleagues and his later career was spent in comparative isolation. He lost his seat in 1910 and died the following year.

Early life

Neild was born in Bristol on 4 January 1846 to Maria Greenwood and John Cash Neild, a surgeon. He was named after his father. In 1853 the family moved to Taranaki in New Zealand, evacuating to Sydney in 1860 to escape the First Taranaki War. On 29 October 1868 Neild married Clara Matilda Gertrude Agnew, whose father Philip founded the New South Wales Free Church of England. Clara died in 1879, three years after the death of the only child of the marriage; Neild remarried on 19 February 1880 at St Paul's Anglican Church in Redfern, to Georgine Marie Louise Uhr, daughter of a former New South Wales sheriff.

Neild had received a private education and was first employed at Montefiore, Joseph & Co., an importing firm. In 1865 he set up as a commission agent, becoming an insurance agent by 1870 and later managing several companies. He was elected to Woollahra Municipal Council in 1876 and in 1882 unsuccessfully stood for the New South Wales Legislative Assembly seat of Paddington. He was successful at his second attempt in 1885, when he was elected as a supporter of Henry Parkes; remaining on Woollahra Council, he served as mayor from 1888 to 1889, leaving the council in 1890.

Colonial politics and military career

Neild devoted his first speech to criticism of the Protectionist Dibbs government, and became known for pursuing causes such as free trade, old-age pensions and law reform. He earned the nickname "Jawbone" on 23 June 1886, after speaking for nine hours against the Jennings government's introduction of ad valorem duties. He was narrowly passed over by Parkes for a ministry in January 1887, but was given charge of Sir Alfred Stephen's divorce extension bill, which passed in 1892. Neild continued to be active in religious affairs, serving from 1891 to 1893 as Right Worshipful Grand Master of the Loyal Orange Institution of New South Wales, although he offended many extreme Protestants by praying for the recovery of the Pope.

Neild began to encounter difficulties in his political career towards the end of the 1880s; his oversight of the establishment of the 1887 Adelaide Jubilee International Exhibition led to investigation by a Legislative Assembly select committee, which absolved him of accusations of extravagance and using his office for personal gain. In 1895 he began to agitate for old-age pensions, but in 1899 he was investigated again after Premier George Reid paid him £350 for writing a report; although Neild repaid the money, the incident was part of the pretext for a successful no confidence motion in September which brought down the Reid government.

In 1896, in response to the establishment of an Irish-Australian unit in the New South Wales citizen army, Neild raised a volunteer regiment that became St George's English Rifles. He was promoted major of the regiment in July 1896 and lieutenant-colonel in April 1898, and frequently led his men, dressed as British soldiers, around Circular Quay to the tune of "The British Grenadiers" or "The English Gentleman". Despite his promotions, Neild had no previous military experience, and in 1899 Lord Beauchamp, the Governor, wrote that his organisation was "in a state of ridiculous insubordination". He was suspended around Easter of that year for publicly criticising a staff officer and encouraging insubordination; following unfavourable findings by a military inquiry, Neild avoided dismissal only by investing considerable amounts of money into the regiment.

Senate

Neild contested the first federal election in 1901, running as a Free Trade candidate for the Senate. Together with Senator Cyril Cameron, he was one of two parliamentarians to wear full dress uniform to the opening of Parliament. He introduced the Parliamentary Evidence Bill on 9 August 1901, which aimed "to enable and regulate the taking of evidence by Parliament and Parliamentary Committees". The bill was withdrawn and reintroduced several times over the next decade but never passed into law. Harbouring ambitions of becoming deputy President, Neild was active in many committees but failed to achieve his aim, although he did serve as Temporary Chairman of Committees from 1903 to 1910.

Neild was not a supporter of party discipline, refusing to follow Sir Josiah Symon's leadership of the Free Trade Senators. He spoke against the dictation test for non-British immigrants and the deportation of Kanaka workers, and continued to advocate free trade and old-age pensions. Having won the fifth position at the 1901 election, Neild faced re-election in 1903, and his impassioned support of the British Empire saw him elected at the head of the poll despite failing health.

In March 1904 Neild attacked the government's military policy and the commander of the military forces, Major-General Sir Edward Hutton, who had long wished to dismiss Neild from the citizen army. Neild had incited a near mutiny by destroying a well-known sergeant's military career, and was suspended from duty; Neild responded by accusing Hutton of intimidation and infringing a Senator's right of freedom of expression. In April 1904 the Senate formed a committee to investigate alleged contempt of Parliament by Hutton, which found that Neild had not been intimidated. In 1905 Neild retired from the militia.

Neild's adventures had seen him lose respect in his political career, and he was now openly mocked in the Senate chamber, becoming something of a joke. He introduced a number of bills in his remaining five years in the Senate, all of which lapsed. He spoke in support of Muslim camel drivers and opposed military training for boys, and continued to oppose elements of the White Australia policy, raising concerns about Australian-born children of Kanaka labourers: "They will have difficulties enough in front of them in a country that is so rampantly strong on the white Australia policy without our making their case worse." Neild was defeated at the 1910 election.

Suffering from hepatic cirrhosis, Neild died at his home in Woollahra on 8 March 1911, aged 65, survived by his second wife and their two children. He received a military funeral before being buried with Anglican rites at Waverley Cemetery in Sydney.

Other interests
Neild published an anthology of his own poetry, Songs 'neath the Southern Cross, in 1896. A review in The Bulletin considered the anthology as unoriginal and adorned with dated expressions such as 'eftsoons', for 'soon afterward'. Neild's usage of this word was oft-quoted, and also mentioned in several of his death commemorations.

References

 

Free Trade Party members of the Parliament of Australia
Commonwealth Liberal Party members of the Parliament of Australia
Members of the Australian Senate for New South Wales
Members of the Australian Senate
Members of the New South Wales Legislative Assembly
Australian Anglicans
Deaths from cirrhosis
1846 births
1911 deaths
20th-century Australian politicians
English emigrants to Australia
Australian military officers